Lev Alekseyevich Gonov (born 6 January 2000) is a Russian road and track cyclist, who currently rides for UCI Continental team .

Major results

Track

2017
 UCI Junior World Track Championships
1st  Team pursuit (with Gleb Syritsa, Ivan Smirnov & Dmitry Mukhomediarov)
2nd Madison
3rd Individual pursuit
 1st  Team pursuit, UEC European Junior Track Championships (with Gleb Syritsa, Ivan Smirnov & Dmitry Mukhomediarov)
 UCI World Cup
3rd Team pursuit, Pruszkow
3rd Team pursuit, Minsk
 2nd Team pursuit, National Track Championships
2018
 UCI Junior World Track Championships
1st  Individual pursuit
2nd Madison
 1st  Team pursuit, National Track Championships (with Gleb Syritsa, Ivan Smirnov and Alexander Evtushenko)
 3rd  Team pursuit, UEC European Under-23 Track Championships
2019
 1st  Team pursuit, European Games
 UEC European Under-23 Track Championships
1st  Team pursuit
3rd  Individual pursuit
2020
 UEC European Track Championships
1st  Team pursuit
3rd  Individual pursuit
 UEC European Under-23 Track Championships
1st  Madison (with Ivan Smirnov)
1st  Team pursuit
3rd  Individual pursuit
 National Track Championships
1st  Individual pursuit
1st  Madison (with Ivan Smirnov)
1st  Team pursuit

Road
2018
 4th Overall Trophée Centre Morbihan
2019
 7th Overall Tour of Fuzhou
1st Stage 5
2020
 4th Time trial, National Road Championships
 4th Grand Prix World's Best High Altitude
 6th Grand Prix Cappadocia

References

External links

2000 births
Living people
Russian male cyclists
Russian track cyclists
European Games gold medalists for Russia
Cyclists at the 2019 European Games
European Games medalists in cycling